Las Buchonas is a Spanish-language telenovela created by Andrés López for Univision y Televisa. The series premiered on Blim on 30 November 2018 and ended on 7 April 2019.

It stars  Vanessa Arias, Candela Márquez, Thali García and Alejandra Robles Gil as the titular characters.

Plot 
The telenovela revolves around Aurora, Yuliana, Manuela and Tabatha, four women seduced by power and money. Aurora's life changes the day the authorities unjustly kill her father. Once a citizen of Tierra Blanca, she becomes the leader of a group of women who rebel against an unjust patriarchy.

Cast 
 Joaquín Cosío as Baltazar
 Arleth Terán as Débora
 Roberto Mateos as Vicente
 Thali García as Manuela
 Alejandra Robles Gil as Tabatha
 Candela Márquez as Yuliana
 Mónica Sánchez Navarro as Chole
 Sebastián Ferrat as Celestino
 Juan Pablo Gil as Luciano
 Frances Ondiviela as Magnolia
 Ireno Alvarez as Mariano
 Pascacio López as Salvador
 Laura Ferretti as Susana Godoy
 Marina Ruiz as Teresa
 Jorge Alberti as Leónidas
 Jorge Ortiz de Pinedo as Rafael León
 Cassandra Sánchez Navarro as Gabriela León
 Miguel Rodarte as Candelario
 Bobby Pulido as El Trueno
 Vanessa Arias as Aurora León

Episodes

References

External links 
 

Television series produced by W Studios
Televisa original programming
2018 telenovelas
2018 Mexican television series debuts
2019 Mexican television series endings
Mexican telenovelas
Blim TV original programming
Works about Mexican drug cartels